Cryphia tephrocharis is a moth of the family Noctuidae. It is found in Turkey and the Balkans. In the Levant recorded from Lebanon, Israel and Jordan.

Adults are on wing from May to August. There is one generation per year.

The larvae probably feed on lichen.

External links
The Acronictinae, Bryophilinae, Hypenodinae and Hypeninae of Israel

Cryphia
Moths of the Middle East
Moths described in 1954